The second generation of the Soyuz spacecraft, the Soyuz 7K-T, comprised Soyuz 12 through Soyuz 40 (1973-1981). In the wake of the Soyuz 11 tragedy, the spacecraft was redesigned to accommodate two cosmonauts who would wear pressure suits at all times during launch, docking, undocking, and reentry. The place of the third cosmonaut was taken by extra life-support systems. Finally, the 7K-T, being intended purely as a space station ferry, had no solar panels, instead sporting two large whip antennas in their place. As a result, it relied on batteries which only provided enough power for two days of standalone flight. The idea was that the Soyuz would recharge while docked with a Salyut space station, but in the event of a docking or other mission failure (which ended up happening on several occasions), the crew was forced to power off everything except communications and life support systems until they could reenter.

Two test flights of the 7K-T were conducted prior to committing the redesigned Soyuz to a crewed mission. Kosmos 496 was launched on 26 June 1972 and spent a week in space, part of it in powered-down mode. Then on 2 September 1972, an attempted launch of a Zenit reconnaissance satellite failed to orbit due to a malfunction of the vernier engines on the Blok A stage. The existing stock of Soyuz boosters had to be modified to prevent a recurrence of this failure mode on a crewed mission, which delayed the next test until almost a year later when Kosmos 573 launched on 15 June 1973 and spent two days in space. With this done, the way was cleared for the first crewed test, Soyuz 12, in September 1972.

In addition, the standalone flights of Soyuz 13, Soyuz 16, Soyuz 19, and Soyuz 22 used a variant of the 7K-T with solar panels, and in the case of 13 and 22, special camera apparatus in place of the docking mechanism. A large Orion 2 astrophysical camera for imaging the sky and Earth were used on the former and an MKF-6 Zeiss camera on the latter.

Another modification was the Soyuz 7K-T/A9 used for the flights to the military Almaz space station. This featured the ability to remote control the space station and a new parachute system and other still classified and unknown changes.

Missions 
 Soyuz 12
 Soyuz 13
 Soyuz 14
 Soyuz 15
 Soyuz 17
 Soyuz 18
 Soyuz 21
 Soyuz 23
 Soyuz 24
 Soyuz 25
 Soyuz 26
 Soyuz 27
 Soyuz 28
 Soyuz 29
 Soyuz 30
 Soyuz 31
 Soyuz 32
 Soyuz 33
 Soyuz 34
 Soyuz 35
 Soyuz 36
 Soyuz 37
 Soyuz 38
 Soyuz 39
 Soyuz 40
 Soyuz 41

Uncrewed tests 
 Cosmos 496
 Cosmos 573
 Cosmos 613
 Cosmos 656
 Soyuz 20

External links 
 Russia New Russian spaceship will be able to fly to Moon - space corp
Mir Hardware Heritage
 David S.F. Portree, Mir Hardware Heritage, NASA RP-1357, 1995
 Mir Hardware Heritage (wikisource)
 Soyuz 7K-T in Encyclopedia Astronautica 
 NASA - Russian Soyuz TMA Spacecraft Details
 Space Adventures circum-lunar mission - details

Crewed spacecraft
Soyuz program
Vehicles introduced in 1972